Corinna is a rural locality in the local government areas of Waratah-Wynyard, Circular Head and West Coast in the North West region of Tasmania.
The 2016 census did not determine a separate population for the state suburb of Corinna, which was included in Waratah.

History
The locality was originally known as Royerine. The town of Corinna was proclaimed in 1894, and the locality was gazetted in 1959. Corinna (kurina) is the Aboriginal name for the Pieman River.

Geography
The Pieman River flows through from south-east to south-west, following the south-western boundary. The Savage River flows through from north-east to south-west, where it joins the Pieman. The locality is completely surrounded by the locality of West Coast.

Road infrastructure
The C249 route (Norfolk Road / Corinna Road) enters from the north and runs through to the south-east before exiting. Route C247 (Corinna Road) starts at an intersection with route C249 and runs north-east before exiting.

See also
 West Coast geographic region

References

Localities of Waratah–Wynyard Council
Localities of Circular Head Council
Localities of West Coast Council
Towns in Tasmania